(Flying Hero: Bugyuru's Adventure) is a vertically scrolling shooter developed by Sting Entertainment and published by SOFEL. It was released in Japan on December 18, 1992 for the Super Famicom. The game was not released in other countries.

Plot 
The player controls a small ball creature with wings and wears tennis shoes named Bugle. The game takes place in Fantasy Land. The demon king and his witch have teamed up to kidnap the hero's girlfriend.

Gameplay 
Flying Hero is a vertical scrolling shooting game. The screen scrolls automatically, but you can adjust the speed to three levels. The game features scaling and rotational effects of sprites. Mode 7 effects are often used on bosses. 

Icons can be found throughout stages which arm the player with weapons including snowballs and lightning bolts.

Enemies in the game include flying monkeys, pirate cows, specters. End and mid-stage bosses include a spinning man made of rock, a jack in the box clown, and a crow pirate leader. One end stage boss is a giant fireball that rises out of water.

The game allows only three continues.

Reception 

Multiple reviewers noted the game was similar to games such as Parodius and TwinBee.

Gamepro previewed the game, and remarked that it looked like "a toy store gone mad", but despite the appearances the game was quite hard. EGM previewed the game and called it a very original title, and called the protagonist a "flying ping pong ball with wings." GameFan praised the game, and recommended to import it as it was unlikely to ever be released outside of Japan. They said that it was intermediately difficult, and perfect for children as they can get a game that's fun without excessive violence. 

Famitsu gave it a score of 25 out of 40 upon release. Games Master said the game was "a vertical blast of fun" but hard to take seriously due to the setting and characters. They ended the review by calling the game "run of the mill" while giving it a 68% score. 

Super Play gave the game a score of 68%, saying "An average shoot em up with study gameplay and a sense of humor, but hardly a must buy." The reviewer recommended the game only to those serious fans of the genre, and those who liked TwinBee games. Italian game magazine Game Power gave the game a score of 82%. French magazine Joypad gave it 81%.

Super Pro gave it 65 out of 100 score, saying "Imaginative graphics, okay sound and all in all fairly playable, with plenty of mega-guardians. some of the baddies are pretty good".

References

External links

 Flying Hero: Bugyuru no Daibouken at superfamicom.org
 フライング ヒーロー at super-famicom.jp 

1992 video games
Japan-exclusive video games
SOFEL games
Sting Entertainment games
Super Nintendo Entertainment System games
Super Nintendo Entertainment System-only games
Vertically scrolling shooters
Video games developed in Japan
Single-player video games